Emek Movie Theater (Turkish: Emek Sineması) was a historical movie hall located in Beyoğlu district of İstanbul, Turkey.

History
The movie theater began construction in 1884 under the name of "Club des Chasseurs de Constantinople" (Hunters Club of Constantinople), and first opened its doors in 1924 under the name of Melek Sineması (Angel Cinema) because of the Art Nouveau style angel figures on the screen. The inner walls and the top of the movie theater have the baroque and rococo style figures. The building has since been known under different names such as  The Greek Gym of Strangali in 1909, then as “Nouveau Cirque” (New Circus). In 1918 the building was known as "Yeni Tiyatro" (New Theater), and "Emek Cinema" in the 1940s. Latterly the building had been used as a skating palace.

Destruction
In 2010, plans were made to demolish the movie theater as part of a shopping mall construction. Several protests were organized to prevent the demolition from taking place.
In 2013, the building was completely demolished.

References

Cinemas in Turkey
Theatres in Istanbul
Theatres completed in 1924
Beyoğlu
Buildings and structures demolished in 2013
Demolished buildings and structures in Istanbul
Art Nouveau architecture in Istanbul
Art Nouveau theatres
1924 establishments in Turkey
2013 disestablishments in Turkey
Entertainment venues in Turkey
Former cinemas